I Am Jazz (announced as All That Jazz) is an American  reality television series on TLC about a transgender girl named Jazz Jennings. The series features Jazz and her family "dealing with typical teen drama through the lens of a transgender youth." I Am Jazz premiered on July 15, 2015.

Synopsis
Jazz Jennings, a South Florida teen, was assigned male at birth. Aged 4, Jennings was diagnosed with gender dysphoria in childhood, making her one of the youngest publicly documented people to be identified as gender dysphoric. Her parents, Greg and Jeanette, decided to support her female gender identity by her fifth birthday. Jazz has been in the spotlight since 2007, when at age 6, she was interviewed by Barbara Walters to discuss her gender identity. She participated in follow-up interviews, launched a foundation, and co-wrote a book, also called I Am Jazz. She has also posted videos about her life on YouTube.

I Am Jazz focuses on the day-to-day lives of the "Jennings" family (the surname "Jennings" is a pseudonym, and any reference to the family's exact location is obscured). Jazz, who was about to enter high school when the series started in 2015, grapples with the usual teen angst in addition to her own challenges as a transgender girl. Her family, which includes her three siblings, parents and grandparents, also talk about their experiences.

Episodes

Series overview

Season 1 (2015)

Season 2 (2016)

Season 3 (2017)

Season 4 (2018)

Season 5 (2019)

Season 6 (2020)

Season 7 (2021–2022)

Season 8 (2023)

Production
The 11-part series involved filming five days a week, including both days on the weekend. The series was initially called All That Jazz, but was retitled to I Am Jazz. The show takes its title from a 2011 documentary, I Am Jazz: A Family in Transition, that aired on the Oprah Winfrey Network.

The one-hour series premiere of I Am Jazz first aired at the same time Caitlyn Jenner was giving her acceptance speech for the Arthur Ashe Courage Award at the 2015 ESPY Awards on ABC.

On March 28, 2019, TLC renewed the series for a sixth season, which premiered on January 28, 2020. In June 2021, TLC renewed the series for a seventh season, with filming commencing the same month.

Broadcast
Internationally, the series premiered in Australia on TLC on December 10, 2015.

Reception
Critic Brian Lowry of Variety praised I Am Jazz, calling it a "sensitively constructed series (in an admirable departure for the attention-seeking network)... Simply told and heartfelt, the show should add a welcome dimension to the education process, capturing the challenges associated with sexual identity at such a vulnerable age."  James Poniewozik, in his review for Time magazine, stated that the reality show airing on the same network that recently pulled 19 Kids and Counting off the air feels like a "change of an era." Poniewozik writes, "I Am Jazz is an engaging story of a teen girl who has transitioned. But it is also the story of everyone else, transitioning." Marc Silver of The Washington Post wrote about the boom of transgender-theme shows on TV, including Jenner's upcoming reality show, I Am Cait: "I Am Cait will surely attract more viewers because of Jenner's fame. It's too soon to say how Jazz will fare. But, with her humor and honesty, she's a tough act for Caitlyn Jenner to follow."

Awards
The show tied for best Outstanding Reality Program at the 27th annual GLAAD Media Awards.

Reality TV Award for Best Docu-series 2020.

See also 

 Becoming Us
 I Am Cait
 Media portrayals of transgender people

References

External links 
 
 

2015 American television series debuts
2010s American LGBT-related television series
2010s American reality television series
2020s American LGBT-related television series
2020s American reality television series
English-language television shows
LGBT culture in Miami
LGBT in Florida
LGBT youth
Television shows set in Florida
TLC (TV network) original programming
Transgender in the United States
Transgender-related television shows
American LGBT-related reality television series
2010s LGBT-related reality television series
Television series about families
Television series about teenagers
2020s LGBT-related reality television series